Christina Fragouli from the University of California, Los Angeles was named Fellow of the Institute of Electrical and Electronics Engineers (IEEE) in 2016 for contributions to network coding.

References

Fellow Members of the IEEE
Living people
Year of birth missing (living people)
Place of birth missing (living people)
University of California, Los Angeles faculty
American electrical engineers